Charles Edwards Sims (born September 19, 1990) is a former American football running back. He was drafted by the Tampa Bay Buccaneers in the third round of the 2014 NFL Draft. He played college football at Houston and West Virginia.

Early years
Sims attended Westbury High School in Houston, Texas, where he played football and ran track. He was named District 21-4A MVP and first-team All-District as a junior after rushing for 1,018 yards and 17 touchdowns, while adding 37 receptions for 425 yards and two scores. In track & field, Sims posted personal-bests of 11.15 seconds in the 100-meter dash and 6.70 meters (21-10.5) in the long jump.

Considered a three-star recruit by Rivals.com, Sims was rated as the 74th best running back prospect of his class.

College career
Sims attended the University of Houston from 2009 to 2012, graduating in the spring. As a freshman, he was the Conference USA Freshman of the Year after rushing for 698 yards and nine touchdowns. He was redshirted in 2010 for academic reasons. He returned in 2011 and was a first-team All-Conference USA after rushing for 821 yards on 110 carries and nine touchdowns. During his final season at Houston in 2012, he was the Andre Ware Offensive MVP and a second-team All-Conference USA selection after rushing for 851 yards on 142 carries with 11 touchdowns.

For his senior year in 2013, Sims transferred to West Virginia University. He was named the team's starter before the season. He rushed for 1,095 yards on 208 carries (5.3 avg) and 11 touchdowns, while catching 45 passes for 401 yards and three touchdowns. He was named a first-team All-Big 12 while adding the honor of Big 12 Offensive Newcomer of the Year.

Career statistics

Professional career

Sims was considered one of the top running back prospects in the 2014 NFL Draft. He was drafted in the third round (69th overall) by the Tampa Bay Buccaneers. In the 2014 season, he finished with 66 carries for 185 yards to go along with 19 receptions for 190 yards. In the 2015 season, he finished with 107 carries for 529 rushing yards to go along with 51 receptions for 561 receiving yards and four receiving touchdowns.

On October 10, 2016, Sims was placed on injured reserve after suffering a knee injury in Week 4 against the Denver Broncos. He was activated off injured reserve on December 10, 2016 prior to Week 14. He was placed back on injured reserve on December 28, 2016. Overall, in the 2016 season, he finished with 51 rushes for 149 yards and a rushing touchdown to go along with 24 receptions for 190 receiving yards and a receiving touchdown. In the 2017 season, he finished with 21 carries for 95 yards to go along with 35 receptions for 249 receiving yards and a receiving touchdown.

On April 26, 2018, Sims re-signed with the Buccaneers on a one-year contract. On August 23, 2018, he was placed on injured reserve with a knee injury. On August 30, 2018, he was released with an injury settlement.

Career statistics

References

External links

Tampa Bay Buccaneers bio
West Virginia Mountaineers bio
Houston Cougars bio

1990 births
Living people
Players of American football from Houston
American football running backs
Westbury High School (Houston) alumni
Houston Cougars football players
West Virginia Mountaineers football players
Tampa Bay Buccaneers players